Sestričky (English: Nurses) is a Slovak medical drama television series directed by Petr Nikolaev and Braňo Mišík and premiered on Televíza Markíza on September 4, 2018 starring Kristína Svarinská, Aniko Vargová, Dana Košicka, and Kristína Madarová as ensemble roles. It is an adaptation of Finnish drama series Syke. The story tells about four colleagues hospital nurses and associated medical personnels daily routine through their career in a hospital and their personal lives.

Synopsis
The four main hospital nurses, Helena, Ema, Jana and Tana experience stressful medical procedure to examine patients. The series overviews their daily activities and efforts to undergo surgical operations the patients including those with critically injured, bleeding or near-death conditions. It also imparts their romantic relationship with fellow doctors and their personal lives outside hospital scope.

Episodes
As of third season, episodes designated up to ten per seasons and each season premiere in every years of September, and it broadcast every Tuesdays. However, Markíza announced the fourth would be extended to twelve episodes per week.

List

Season 1 (2018)

Season 2 (2019)

Season 3 (2020)

Season 4 (2021)

Cast and characters 
 Kristina Svarinská as Ema Farkašová – a nurse and one of colleague of the nurses. Ema has a son, Tobi and estranged her husband Tibor after longtime period, who intensifies his love. While also in her career, she finds Dano, a paramedic. She is attracted by Dano while Tibor intervenes to her life.
 Dana Košicka as Helena Javorská – the head nurse of the hospital department. She suffered with anxiety disorder while her husband Viktor, entered a coma after longtime battle with stroke.
 Anikó Vargová as Táňa Šoltýsová – a nurse and colleague of the three nurses. She covets her returning to family and self-assured about her life, and caring patients.
 Kristina Madarová as Jana Sýkorová – a nurse and colleagues of the three nurses, she has two daughters and cares as maternal love. She joined the hospital department to become doctor and adjust her life. She finds Filip, a cardiologist, they accidentally fall in love.
Juraj Loj as Tomas
Milo Král as Filip Vágner
Braňo Mosný as Ivan Chromík
Matúš Kvietik as Dano
Martin Mnahoncák as Peter Gábor
 Anna Šišková as Marta
 Helena Krajčiová as Linda
 Elena Podzámska as Ingrid Garinová

Awards and nominations

References

External links
  

2018 Slovak television series debuts
Slovak drama television series
Medical television series
Melodrama television series
Television series based on adaptations
Television shows set in Slovakia
Television episodes set in hospitals
Television series set in the 2010s
Markíza original programming